Bodø Spektrum is an indoor sports complex in Bodø, Norway. In 1990, construction of Nordlandshallen started, which would allow Glimt a winter training ground, It opened on 21 September 1991.

The largest hall is Nordlandshallen, an association football hall with artificial turf and seating for 5,500 used by Bodø/Glimt and Grand Bodø. Bodøhallen opened in 2007 and is used for handball by Bodø HK. It also consists of Nordlandsbadet, a water park.

Nordlandshallen was used as Bodø/Glimts main venue during the last season matches in the Norwegian Premier League in 1993 and 1997.

See also
 List of indoor arenas in Norway
 List of indoor ice rinks in Norway

References
Bibliography
 
 

Notes

External links
 

Football venues in Norway
Eliteserien venues
Indoor arenas in Norway
Sports venues in Bodø
1991 establishments in Norway
Sports venues completed in 1991
FK Bodø/Glimt